Mikhail Vladimirovich Bersnev (born 31 March 2002) is a Russian football player who plays for FC Krasnodar-2.

Club career
He made his debut in the Russian Football National League for FC Krasnodar-2 on 10 July 2021 in a game against FC Spartak-2 Moscow.

References

External links
 
 Profile by Russian Football National League

2002 births
Living people
Russian footballers
Association football forwards
FC Krasnodar-2 players
Russian Second League players
Russian First League players